Synoptic may refer to:

Synoptic scale meteorology, a meteorological analysis over an area about 1000 kilometres or more wide
Synoptic Gospels, in the New Testament of the Bible, the gospels of Matthew, Mark, and Luke
Synoptic philosophy, wisdom emerging from a coherent understanding of everything together
Large Synoptic Survey Telescope, a wide-field reflecting telescope, currently under construction, that will photograph the entire available sky every few nights
SynOptics, an early computer-network equipment vendor that operated from 1985 until 1994, based in Santa Clara, California
Surface synoptic observations or SYNOP, a numerical code used for reporting weather observations
Synopticon, "surveillance of the few by the many", a reverse of Bentham's Panopticism

See also
 Synopsis (disambiguation)